Serras de Aire e Candeeiros Natural Park (PNSAC) is a natural park in central west Portugal. It was made a protected area in 1979 with the intend to protect the existing natural aspects and the architectonic and cultural heritage linked to the local populations.

Location
The park is located in the central-west region of Portugal defining the border between the districts of Leiria and Santarém. It comprises part of the municipalities of Alcanena, Alcobaça, Batalha, Leiria, Ourém, Porto de Mós, Rio Maior, Santarém and Torres Novas.

PNSAC is mainly composed by mountain ranges (Serras) and plateaus: The Serra de Aire in the northeast; the Serra de Candeeiros in the west, adjacent to Aire, between Porto de Mós and Rio Maior; the Santo António plateau in the centre and part of the São Mamede plateau in the north.

Geomorphology

Orogeny

The park is located in the Estremadura Limestone Massif, a geomorphological unit of Portugal where rocks from the Jurassic flourish to a great extent. The massif was created by the distensive opening phases of the Lusitanian Basin during the Mesozoic and the alpine compressive regimes established from the end of the Cretaceous. The São Mamede Plateau and Serra de Aire are the result of a rollover anticline.

Geology
With a vigorous and rugged landscape, the park has some of the most interesting geological formations in the country.

The nature park is evidenced both by its relief, as a prominent mass that rises about  relative to its surroundings, and by its white, highly permeable limestones, which are dissolved by the relatively abundant rains, creating cracks where water infiltrates. These characteristics justify the absence of shallow watercourses, and the presence, instead, of a vast network of underground galleries, being perhaps one of the largest freshwater reservoirs in the country, giving rise to some important water courses, such as the Alviela and Lena rivers. Water, practically invisible on the surface, is the main erosive agent, contributing to some of the most interesting geological formations in the country, such as pit caves, sinkholes, uvalas, poljes, limestone pavements, ponors, etc...

Similarly to river dynamics, water is collected in low areas or in depressions (such as poljes) after infiltrating from higher surfaces, enriching the flood beds with sediments. After the wet season, these depressions are emptied, giving rise to fertile terra rossa plains where maize, potatoes, vines are grown, a variety of other crops and even vegetable gardens, resulting in a mosaic of colors and textures with great seasonal dynamics.

The terrain is characteristically dry due to its porosity and the first settlements were dependent on terra rossa for their activities. Currently, with the population less dependent on agricultural and pastoral activities, there has been a dispersion of buildings in the landscape, both for housing and for support of other economic activities. This diversification of the economy is partly responsible for the abandonment of the most traditional activities.

Ecology

Flora

The natural park is part of the Southwest Iberian Mediterranean sclerophyllous and mixed forests and hosts more than 600 different plant species. The vegetation that characterizes the PNSAC is the result of the bioclimatic influences on the territory. There is a great wealth of species with a diversity of sizes and origin (from Atlantic Europe, the Mediterranean, the Iberian Peninsula and North Africa), rare and unique Portuguese species, paleoclimatic species, some even used for medicinal, culinary, aromatic or ornamental purposes. Though floristically rich, the park has suffered dramatic changes over the years. The Alvados Depression is a clear example of this dynamism; at present its landscape is agrarian; however, centuries ago, at the time of its occupation by its first settlers, the area was a marsh that was surrounded by oak groves, pine groves and strawberry trees. Later, with the romanization, it became an olive grove with grafts of wild-olive.

The park has five main associated landscapes:

The shrublands, with typical Mediterranean scrub which include Quercus coccifera, Erica arborea, Erica scoparia, Ulex, Cystus, Phillyrea latifolia, Phillyrea angustifolia, Rhamnus alaternus, Pistacia lentiscus, Olea oleaster, Lavandula stoechas, rosemary, oregano, bay laurel, Arbutus unedo, Daphne gnidium, Lonicera etrusca, Crataegus monogyna, Rubia peregrina, Smilax aspera, Rubus ulmifolius
The humid oak and pine forests, featuring Q. rotundifolia, Q. faginea and Q. suber, Pinus pinaster, Pinus pinea, Hedera hibernica, Viburnum tinus, Ruscus aculeatus, Pteridium aquilinum, one of the most representative vegetative formations in the park. Q. pyrenaica is restricted to the centre of the park and Q. suber is uncommon due to its dislike for calcareous soils

The lithophyte plants, such as Sedum forsterianum, Petrosedum sediforme, Sedum album, Coronilla glauca, Thymus zygis, Arabis sadina, Rhamnus alaternus, Antirrhinum linkianum, Polypodium cambricum, Asplenium trichomanes, Asplenium ruta-muraria, Asplenium ceterach
The human-introduced eucalyptus forests, olive groves and pastures, which are commonly associated with grasses such as Koeleria vallesiana, Dactylis glomerata, Melica minuta, Briza maxima, Hordeum murinum, Brachypodium phoenicoides, Bromus diandrus, Holcus lanatus, Lagurus ovatus, Helictochloa marginata, Euphorbia paniculata, Euphorbia characias, Convolvulus arvensis
The riparian forests of Ulmus minor, Sambucus nigra, Salix atrocinerea, Salix alba, Alnus glutinosa, Tamarix gallica, Fraxinus angustifolia, very rare and degraded

Additionally, the park has 27 different species of orchid, about 50% of all the species native to Portugal and provides habitat for various calcerous flora that is uncommonly found in Portugal including: Iris subbiflora, Paeonia broteri, Paeonia officinalis, Jonopsidium abulense, Himantoglossum robertianum, Orobanche latisquama, Petrosedum sediforme, Scrophularia sambucifolia, Antirrhinum linkianum Teucrium chamaedrys, Salvia viridis, Inula montana, Aristolochia pistolochia, Teucrium fruticans, Ophrys fusca, Phlomis lychnitis, Fritillaria lusitanica and some Portuguese endemics such as Silene longicilia, Arabis sadina, Arrhenatherum pallens, Ulex jussiaei, Narcissus calcicola, Ulex airensis., Saxifraga cintrana and a newly described species in Portugal, Arenaria grandiflora, which is currently only known to exist in the park.

Fauna

The distribution and biodiversity of mammals is in part due to bioclimatic and geoecological characteristics. The fauna was drastically affected by the human occupation of this territory, which devastated habitats and destroyed resources. According to Alho (1997), a total of 204 species of vertebrates, of which 136 are birds, have been identified. Mammals located in the park can be divided according to size into micromammals, mesomammals and large mammals. Bats represent almost half of the mammal species in the park, with 21 known different species.

The micromammals, present by the orders insectivores, chiropterans, and rodents include the European hedgehog, the greater white-toothed shrew, the Etruscan shrew, the Iberian shrew, and the Spanish mole, the house mouse, the Algerian mouse, the black rat, the wood mouse, the Lusitanian pine vole, the Mediterranean pine vole, the greater horseshoe bat, the Mehely's horseshoe bat, the lesser horseshoe bat, the Mediterranean horseshoe bat, the Geoffroy's bat, the Bechstein's bat, the greater mouse-eared bat, the Natterer's bat, the lesser mouse-eared bat, the common pipistrelle, the serotine bat, the common bent-wing bat, or the European free-tailed bat
The mesomammals are present by species of the order lagomorpha, which include the European rabbit and the Granada hare
the large mammals group the carnivore and ungulate orders and are represented by the European badger, the beech marten, the Eurasian otter, the least weasel, the European polecat, the red fox, the common genet, the Egyptian mongoose, the Iberian lynx, the European wildcat and the domestic donkey

Among the several migratory and resident bird species the most common are the short-toed snake eagle, the common buzzard, the common cuckoo, the Eurasian hoopoe, the great spotted woodpecker, the crested lark, the woodlark, the Eurasian skylark, the red-rumped swallow, the white wagtail, the Eurasian wren, the European robin, the black redstart, the European stonechat, the blue rock thrush, the Sardinian warbler, the Eurasian blackcap, the Iberian chiffchaff, the short-toed treecreeper, the Red-billed chough, the carrion crow, the spotless starling, the common linnet, the cirl bunting or the corn bunting.

Although lacking any water courses, the park has a surprising amount of amphibians, 13 species are known, which include the marbled newt, the Iberian ribbed newt, the western spadefoot, the common midwife toad, the Iberian painted frog, the Mediterranean tree frog, the Iberian frog, the Perez's frog, the common parsley frog, the common toad, among others.

Unlike water courses, underground galleries are vast and a number os endemic species inhabits these spaces, among them are Nesticus lusitanicus, Trechus machadoi, Trechus gamae, Trechus lunai in the Troglofauna, and Proasellus lusitanicus in the Stygofauna.

The park has around 17 species of reptiles, which include the spiny-footed lizard, the common wall gecko, the Carbonell's wall lizard, the Iberian wall lizard, the Spanish psammodromus, the Algerian psammodromus, the ocellated lizard, the Lataste's viper, the horseshoe whip snake, the viperine water snake, the southern smooth snake, the ladder snake or the Montpellier snake

Fish recorded in the park include the Iberian nase and Achondrostoma oligolepis.

Climate

The park has a Mediterranean climate, with mild, rainy winters and cool to hot, dry summers but variations in temperature, precipitation and insolation occur throughout the region. Altitude also plays a role.

The prevailing N-NW winds carry air masses loaded with moisture that cause intense fog and strong winter rainfall. As summer approaches, the Azores High moves further north. Clear skies become more frequent and rain is scarce between July and August. Fog is very common in winter, and in the summer, fog created by the marine layer can move from the Atlantic to the interior, but usually evaporates by midday. Average relative humidity is very high in the winter and values in the summer can have extreme variations, often below 40% during the day and above 80% at night. Temperatures at night are generally cool year-round but the high humidity along an absence of wind can make it more pleasant. Insolation varies between 2300 hours in the northwest mountains (south of Porto de Mós) and 2650 hours in the east. In general, Serra dos Candeeiros receives a larger influence from the Atlantic, whereas Serra de Aire has a more Mediterranean influenced climate.

Natural heritage

Karst landscapes

There are over 130 identified caves in the park. Some notable cave complexes include the Mira de Aire Caves, the Alvados Caves, the Almonda spring caves (including the Cave of Aroeira) and the Algar do Pena.

Other notable geological formations include:
Polje of Minde-Mira de Aire, a great karst depression and Ramsar wetland located between the towns of Minde and Mira de Aire, which floods with some frequency during the winter.
Alviela karst spring and the Ribeira dos Amiais ponor
Fórnea, a natural amphitheatre formed by temporary springs
Arrimal Lagoons, sinkholes with naturally waterproofed bottoms with clays and other sediments
Rio Maior salt pans, known at least since 1177, the only inland salt pans in Portugal, created by an underground gallery that passes through a rock salt field and feeds a well.

Paleontology and archaeology
The park contains two Middle Jurassic tracksites: the sauropod footprints of Serra de Aire and the dinosaur footprints of Vale de Meios. Both are the oldest known dinosaur footprints in the Iberian Peninsula. The Serra de Aire tracksite is one of the few sites in the world where Middle Jurassic sauropod dinosaur tracks can be found. The Vale Florido biostromes have fossilized coral and algae. Ammonites, belemnites, brachiopods, bivalves and ichnofossils have been discovered in a stratum in Barranco de Zambujal. The Jurassic Beach of São Bento, discovered in 2003, has a variety of fossilized echinoderms. The Cave of Aroeira near the park has the earliest recorded human trace in Portugal, along with deer, equids, rhinoceros, bear, a large bovid, a caprid, and a Testudo tortoise. Squeletal remains of Pleistocene brown bears have also been discovered in Algar do Vale da Pena, near the village of Moita do Poço. A Chalcolithic dolmen that was Christianized into a chapel still remains close to a church in Alcobertas. There are also Roman remains, notably a road in Alqueidão da Serra, Porto de Mós which dates between the centuries I BC and I AD.

Threats

Even though a protected nature area was created to protect the existing natural aspects and architectonic heritage, the construction of quarries and wind turbines have increased since then, placing many of the local fauna and flora at risk. Every year, dozens of birds and bats are killed by the  blades of wind turbines and severe numbers of reptile and amphibian species are roadkilled. Some measurements taken to prevent this include the investment in nature tourism, scientific investigation and agriculture, particularly biological farming.

Views of the park from urban centers

References

External links
 Serras de Aire e Candeeiros Nature Park
 Parque Natural das Serras de Aire e Candeeiros
 Serras de Aire e Candeeiros - In Portuguese

Nature parks in Portugal